Bait Cove was a hamlet in the Twillingate District, Newfoundland and Labrador. It had no remaining population by 1911.

See also
List of ghost towns in Newfoundland and Labrador

Ghost towns in Newfoundland and Labrador